The 2004 Polish Figure Skating Championships were held in Łódź between December 12 and 14, 2003.

Senior results

Men

Judges were:
 Referee: Hanna Then
 Assistant Referee: Maria Miller
 Judge No. 1: Maria Olesińska
 Judge No. 2: Olga Pałasz
 Judge No. 3: Adrianna Lachowicz
 Judge No. 4: Ryszard Kiewrel
 Judge No. 5: Jan Wikłacz
 Judge No. 6: Anna Sierocka
 Judge No. 7: Katarzyna Żakowska

Ladies

Judges were:
 Referee: Danuta Dubrówko
 Assistant Referee: Maria Olesińska
 Judge No. 1: Tomasz Mydlarz
 Judge No. 2: Małgorzata Sobków
 Judge No. 3: Andżelika Rzeczkowska
 Judge No. 4: Katarzyna Kiewrel
 Judge No. 5: Katarzyna Żakowska
 Judge No. 6: Magdalena Seredyńska
 Judge No. 7: Jan Wikłacz

Pairs

Judges were:
 Referee: Anna Sierocka
 Assistant Referee: Andżelika Rzeczkowska
 Judge No. 1: Ryszard Kiewrel
 Judge No. 2: Agata Wasilewska
 Judge No. 3: Joanna Szczerba
 Judge No. 4: Agata Stoczek
 Judge No. 5: Hanna Then

Ice dancing

Judges were:
 Referee: Małgorzata Sobków
 Assistant Referee: Maria Miller
 Judge No. 1: Andrzej Alberciak
 Judge No. 2: Andrzej Józefowicz
 Judge No. 3: Tomasz Politański
 Judge No. 4: Marcin Kozubek
 Judge No. 5: Małgorzata Grajcar
 Judge No. 6: Danuta Dubrówko
 Judge No. 7: Marcin Czajka

Junior results

Men

Judges were:
 Referee: Ryszard Kiewrel
 Assistant Referee: Andrzej Józefowicz
 Judge No. 1: Adrianna Lachowicz
 Judge No. 2: Danuto Dubrówko
 Judge No. 3: Magdalena Seredyńska
 Judge No. 4: Joanna Szczerba
 Judge No. 5: Hanna Then
 Judge No. 6: Agata Stoczek
 Judge No. 7: Andżelika Rzeczkowska

Ladies

Judges were:
 Referee: Małgorzata Sobków
 Assistant Referee: Jan Wikłacz
 Judge No. 1: Katarzyna Kiewrel
 Judge No. 2: Agata Wasilewska
 Judge No. 3: Tomasz Mydlarz
 Judge No. 4: Olga Pałasz
 Judge No. 5: Mirella Stępień
 Judge No. 6: Agata Stoczek
 Judge No. 7: Maria Olesińska

Pairs

Judges were:
 Referee: Anna Sierocka
 Assistant Referee: Andżelika Rzeczkowska
 Judge No. 1: Ryszard Kiewrel
 Judge No. 2: Agata Wasilewska
 Judge No. 3: Joanna Szczerba
 Judge No. 4: Agata Stoczek
 Judge No. 5: Hanna Then

Ice dancing

Judges were:
 Referee: Danuta Dubrówko
 Assistant Referee: Maria Miller
 Judge No. 1: Marcin Kozubek
 Judge No. 2: Tomasz Politański
 Judge No. 3: Małgorzata Sobków
 Judge No. 4: Andrzej Józefowicz
 Judge No. 5: Andrzej Alberciak
 Judge No. 6: Marcin Czajka
 Judge No. 7: Małgorzata Grajcar

Synchronized

Judges were:
 Referee: Joanna Szczerba
 Assistant Referee: Danuta Dubrówko
 Judge No. 1: Marcin Czajka
 Judge No. 2: Magdalena Seredyńska
 Judge No. 3: Marcin Kozubek
 Judge No. 4: Ryszard Kiewrel
 Judge No. 5: Andrzej Józefowicz

Novice results

Men

Judges were:
 Referee: Maria Olesińska
 Assistant Referee: Agata Wasilewska
 Judge No. 1: Adrianna Lachowicz
 Judge No. 2: Joanna Szczerba
 Judge No. 3: Mirella Stępień
 Judge No. 4: Katarzyna Żakowska
 Judge No. 5: Agata Stoczek
 Judge No. 6: Olga Pałasz
 Judge No. 7: Katarzyna Kiewrel

Ladies

Judges were:
 Referee: Jan Wikłacz
 Assistant Referee: Magdalena Seredyńska
 Judge No. 1: Andżelika Rzeczkowska
 Judge No. 2: Adrianna Lachowicz
 Judge No. 3: Ryszard Kiewrel
 Judge No. 4: Agata Wasilewska
 Judge No. 5: Mirella Stępień
 Judge No. 6: Tomasz Mydlarz
 Judge No. 7: Joanna Szczerba

Pairs

Judges were:
 Referee: Anna Sierocka
 Assistant Referee: Tomasz Mydlarz
 Judge No. 1: Katarzyna Żakowska
 Judge No. 2: Ryszard Kiewrel
 Judge No. 3: Olga Pałasz
 Judge No. 4: Magdalena Seredyńska
 Judge No. 5: Katarzyna Kiewrel

Ice dancing

Judges were:
 Referee: Danuta Dubrówko
 Assistant Referee: Maria Miller
 Judge No. 1: Agnieszka Domańska
 Judge No. 2: Małgorzata Grajcar
 Judge No. 3: Tomasz Politański
 Judge No. 4: Andrzej Józefowicz
 Judge No. 5: Marcin Czajka

External links
 2004 Polish Championships results at the Polish Figure Skating Association
 Junior men results
 Junior ladies results
 Junior pairs results
 Junior dance results
 Novice men results
 Novice ladies results
 Novice pairs results
 Novice dance results

Polish Figure Skating Championships
2003 in figure skating
2003 in Polish sport